Jacques Yaméogo (24 July 1943, in Bobo-Dioulasso – 20 June 2010, in Bobo-Dioulasso) is a Burkinabé football player and manager.

Career
He played for RC Bobo Dioulasso, Étoile Filante de Koudougou and US Yatenga.

Yaméogo led the Burkina Faso national under-17 football team at the FIFA U-17 World Championship in 1999 and 2001. In 2002, he worked with Pihouri Weboanga as a head coach of the Burkina Faso national football team.

References

External links
 

1943 births
2010 deaths
Burkinabé footballers
Burkinabé expatriate footballers
Burkinabé football managers
Burkina Faso national football team managers
2002 African Cup of Nations managers
Association footballers not categorized by position
People from Bobo-Dioulasso
21st-century Burkinabé people